Debra is a female given name.

It may also refer to:

Places
 Debra (community development block), an administrative division in West Bengal, India 
 Debra (Vidhan Sabha constituency), an assembly constituency in West Bengal
 Debra, Paschim Medinipur, a village in West Bengal, India
 Debra, Grenada – see List of cities in Grenada

Other uses
 Tropical Storm Debra (disambiguation)
 Debra!, a Canadian children's television show
 "Debra" (song), by the American artist Beck
 DEBRA, an international medical charity with national groups
 Diffuse extragalactic background radiation, in astronomy
 Debra Thana Sahid Kshudiram Smriti Mahavidyalaya, also known as Debra College, a college in West Bengal